Big Horn County School District #4 is a public school district based in Basin, Wyoming, United States.

Geography
Big Horn County School District #4 serves southern Big Horn County and a very small, detached tract of land in northeastern Park County, including the following communities:

Incorporated places
Town of Basin
Town of Manderson
Census-designated places (Note: All census-designated places are unincorporated.)
Hyattville
Meadow Lark Lake

Schools
Riverside High School (Grades 9–12)
Cloud Peak Middle School (Grades 6–8)
Manderson Elementary School (Grades K-5)
Laura Irwin Elementary School (Grades K-5)

Student demographics
The following figures are as of October 1, 2009.

Total District Enrollment: 297
Student enrollment by gender
Male: 157 (52.86%)
Female: 140 (47.14%)
Student enrollment by ethnicity
Asian: 1 (0.34%)
Black or African American: 1 (0.34%)
Hispanic or Latino: 31 (10.44%)
Two or More Races: 3 (1.01%)
White: 261 (87.88%)

See also
List of school districts in Wyoming

References

External links
Big Horn County School District #4 – official site.

Education in Big Horn County, Wyoming
Education in Park County, Wyoming
School districts in Wyoming